The New York Intellectuals were a group of American writers and literary critics based in New York City in the mid-20th century. They advocated left-wing politics but were also firmly anti-Stalinist. The group is known for having sought to integrate literary theory with Marxism and socialism while rejecting Soviet socialism as a workable or acceptable political model.

Trotskyism emerged as the most common standpoint among these anti-Stalinist Marxists. Irving Kristol, Irving Howe, Seymour Martin Lipset, Leslie Fiedler and Nathan Glazer were members of the Trotskyist Young People's Socialist League.

Overview

Writers often identified as members of this group include Lionel Abel, Hannah Arendt, William Barrett, Daniel Bell, Saul Bellow (despite his usual association with the city of Chicago), Norman Birnbaum, Elliot Cohen, Midge Decter, Morris Dickstein, Leslie Fiedler, Nathan Glazer, Clement Greenberg, Paul Goodman, Richard Hofstadter, Sidney Hook, Irving Howe, Alfred Kazin, Irving Kristol, 
Norman Mailer, Seymour Martin Lipset, Mary McCarthy, Dwight Macdonald, William Phillips, Norman Podhoretz, Philip Rahv, Harold Rosenberg, Isaac Rosenfeld, Delmore Schwartz, Susan Sontag, Harvey Swados, Diana Trilling, Lionel Trilling, and Robert Warshow.

Many of these intellectuals were educated at City College of New York ("Harvard of the Proletariat"), New York University, and Columbia University in the 1930s, and associated in the next two decades with the left-wing political journals Partisan Review and Dissent, as well as the then-left-wing but later neoconservative-leaning journal Commentary. Writer Nicholas Lemann has described these intellectuals as "the American Bloomsbury".

Some, including Kristol, Hook, and Podhoretz, later became key figures in the development of Neoconservatism.

See also
Communism
Frankfurt School
Trotskyism
Anti-Stalinist left

References

Bibliography 

Bloom, Alexander. Prodigal Sons: The New York Intellectuals and Their World, Oxford University Press, 1986, 
Cooney, Terry A. The Rise of the New York Intellectuals: Partisan Review and Its Circle, 1934-1945, University of Wisconsin Press, 1986, 
Dorman, Joseph. Arguing the World: The New York Intellectuals in their Own Words. New York: Free Press, 2000. .
 
Jumonville, Neil. Critical Crossings: The New York Intellectuals in Postwar America, University of California Press, 1991, 
Laskin, David. Partisans: Marriage, Politics, and Betrayal Among the New York Intellectuals University of Chicago Press, 2001,

Further reading

External links
 Lives of the New York intellectuals by Robert Fulford in The Globe and Mail
 The Failure of the New York Intellectuals by Daniel Silliman in Comment
 Arguing the World, the PBS documentary

Literary circles
Literary criticism
Anti-Stalinist left
Culture of New York City
Writing circles
Jews and Judaism in New York City
Socialism in New York (state)